The Martin city gate is one of three still existing city gates of the German city of Cochem.

History 
The Martin city gate was built in 1352 according to an order of elector  Baldwin of Luxembourg, the archbishop of Trier. It was built as a toll house. A chain, connecting the city gate with the opposite border of the river Mosel could stop ships trying to escape their duty of paying taxes.

Later on a new owner, Louis Ravené, created a storing room for ice in the small tower of the city gate.

External links 
 Information about the Martin city gate as well as a webcam

Buildings and structures in Cochem-Zell
Gates in Germany
Fortifications in Germany
City walls in Germany